Euaethiops is a genus of moths of the family Erebidae. The genus was erected by George Hampson in 1926.

Species
Euaethiops cyanopasta Hampson, 1926
Euaethiops limbata Holland, 1894

References

Calpinae